Chaetonotus elegans is a species of gastrotrichs in the genus Chaetonotus. It is found in freshwater of Europe.

References

External links 
 
 Chaetonotus (Chaetonotus) elegans at the World Register of Marine Species (WoRMS)

elegans
Animals described in 1921